The Technical Security Branch of the Royal Canadian Mounted Police holds jurisdiction over all forms of Computer crime in Canada.

References

Royal Canadian Mounted Police - Technical Security Branch - Mandate

Law enforcement in Canada
Cybercrime in Canada